Olga Rudenko (born 1989) is a Ukrainian journalist who worked for Kyiv Post before leaving to assist in the establishment of the Kyiv Independent in 2021, where she is the editor-in-chief. Her work has also been published in a number of major Western news outlets, including the Washington Times, the Global Post and USA Today.

In 2022, Rudenko featured as the front cover image on Time magazine's May double issue.

Early life
Rudenko's father died when she was four years old. Her mother raised her on her own in Dnipro. Although encouraged to follow an economics career, she chose journalism instead, which she studied at the city's university.

Career
Rudenko began her journalism career by working as an intern at a local newspaper. In 2011 she moved to Kyiv and began working for the Kyiv Post newspaper as a lifestyle journalist, initially contributing to the newspaper's recently established Ukrainian language website. She subsequently wrote articles in English, including covering the 2014 Russian conflict in the Donbas region of Ukraine. In 2016 she was promoted to the post of 'national editor', and by 2017 she had become the deputy to the newspaper's editor in chief.

In 2021, Rudenko accepted the offer of a fellowship from the Stigler Center at the University of Chicago Booth School of Business. Whilst still in Chicago, a large number of her colleagues at the Kyiv Post were sacked by the newspaper's proprietor because they had been refusing to work with a newly appointed editor who had been brought in to ensure the paper wrote pieces that were less critical of the Ukrainian government under President Zelensky. Rudenko joined these colleagues who, in November 2021, decided to set up their own, independent news outlet -  the Kyiv Independent. She was unanimously chosen to be its editor in chief, and by 2022 she was in charge of 24 journalists and editors. The publication was independent. As Russia's troops gathered on the border she described the President as "mediocre" in an op-ed for the New York Times titled "The Comedian-turned-President is seriously in over his Head".

When Russia's invasion of Ukraine started in February 2022, Kyiv came under immediate bombardment. With the likelihood of phone and internet connections being lost, Rudenko moved out of the city to western Ukraine where she continued to work to report on the developing situation in her war-torn country. The journalist's wages were supported by a grant from the European Union and the Kyiv Independent's CEO Daryna Shevchenko had to work out how to invest the £1.5m of crowdfunding that the publication had attracted. They needed to find satellite phones, protective clothing and support the two million followers they quickly gathered on social-media.

In May 2022, Time Magazine named Olga Rudenko as one of its Next Generation Leaders and featured her on the cover of its May double issue. Speaking to the magazine about the changing style of news reporting as the Russian invasion of Ukraine unfolded, Rudenko said: "It felt like we were defending the essence of journalism."

References

External links
 
 Time magazine video with Olga Rudenko.
 Hariman Institute, Columbia University interview with Olga Rudenko.

21st-century Ukrainian journalists
Ukrainian women journalists
Newspaper editors
Writers from Dnipro
1989 births
Living people
Women newspaper editors
Ukrainian editors
Ukrainian women editors
21st-century Ukrainian women writers